Vijaya Gauri is a 1955 Telugu-language swashbuckler film, produced by Krishna Pictures banner and directed by D. Yoganand. It stars N. T. Rama Rao, Padmini  and music composed by G. Ramanathan and Viswanathan–Ramamoorthy.

This film is shot simultaneously in Tamil as Kaveri with slightly different cast.

Plot
The film begins in a small kingdom Mangalapuri which is under the jurisdiction of Manipura. The Prince of Mangalapuri Gunasagara in disguise as Janadasu always fights against the atrocities of the Emperor. In that process, he falls for a girl named Gauri, the daughter of a hotel owner. Right now, the Emperor orders to pay a huge amount of taxes when the King the Mangalapuri sends his son Gunasagara as a mediator. Despite, listening to their predicament, the Emperor refuses. Here the Emperor's daughter Vijaya loves Gunasagara at first sight and secretly helps them in paying taxes. Being cognizant of Vijaya's love the Emperor sends chief commander Veerasimha as an emissary to fix her alliance with Gunasagara to which he refuses. Meanwhile, Veerasimha is attracted to Gauri and tries to grab her when Gunasagara lands for her rescue. In the combat, Gunasagara is severely injured and loses his memory. At present, Veerasimha feels it is the best time to couple up him with Vijaya. At that point, Gauri arrives as a gypsy to see Gunasegara when Vijaya feels jealous and wants to remove her from her path. What happens ultimately?

Cast
N. T. Rama Rao
Padmini
Relangi
Gummadi
M. N. Nambiar
Mahankali Venkaiah
A. V. Subba Rao
Rushyendramani
Surabhi Kamalabai
Surabhi Balasaraswathi
Lalitha
Ragini

Soundtrack

Music composed by G. Ramanathan & Viswanathan–Ramamoorthy. Lyrics were written by Samudrala Jr. Music released by H.M.V. Audio Company.

References

Indian adventure films
Films scored by G. Ramanathan
Films scored by Viswanathan–Ramamoorthy